The 1973 Northern Illinois Huskies football team represented Northern Illinois University as an independent during the 1973 NCAA Division I football season. Led by third-year head coach Jerry Ippoliti, the Huskies compiled a record of 6–5. Northern Illinois played home games at Huskie Stadium in DeKalb, Illinois.

Schedule

Roster

References

Northern Illinois
Northern Illinois Huskies football seasons
Northern Illinois Huskies football